Inet or INET may refer to:

 The internet, global system of interconnected computer networks
 Inet, electronic trading platform from the 1970s until its acquisition in 2002
 INET or Institute for New Economic Thinking, New York City think tank
 Inet TV, South Korean television channel
 INET, company in Denji Sentai Megaranger, Japanese television serial of 1997–1998
 the INET Framework, open-source model library for an OMNeT++ simulation environment

See also
 iiNet, an Australian Internet service provider